Nusratullo Makhsum (Russian and Tajik: Нусратулло Махсум, formerly: Kaznok) is a jamoat in Tajikistan. It is located in Rasht District, one of the Districts of Republican Subordination. The jamoat has a total population of 13,762 (2015).

Notes

References

Populated places in Districts of Republican Subordination
Jamoats of Tajikistan